Rockity Roll was the third solo recording released by Mike Doughty after the breakup of his former band, Soul Coughing. It is a six-song EP which he recorded in New York City over two days in May 2003 at Pat Dillett's tiny, windowless cubby at Kampo studios.

Everything on the record was recorded by Doughty: vocal, acoustic guitar, and programming done on a lo-fi Roland Groovebox.

The self-released version of Rockity Roll is out of print; it is currently available (with bonus tracks) as part of the Skittish / Rockity Roll two disc re-release.

Track listing
All songs written and performed by Mike Doughty.

 "Ways + Means" – 3:06
 "27 Jennifers" – 2:49
 "Down on the River by the Sugar Plant" – 3:07
 "40 Grand in the Hole" – 2:15
 "Ossining" – 2:37
 "Cash Cow" – 3:22

2003 EPs
Mike Doughty albums
Albums produced by Pat Dillett